Thomas Fotheringham Cook (7 June 1908 – 31 May 1952) was a Scottish Labour Party politician.

Cook was the son of a miner and was born in Larkhall. He was interested in politics from the time he was an apprentice electrician, and was active in the co-operative movement in Rutherglen.

Cook was active in the Independent Labour Party until the early 1930s, when he joined the Scottish Socialist Party split.<ref>The Times Guide to the House of Commons: 1950, p.244</ref> This affiliated to the Labour Party, under which label Cook served as Member of Parliament for constituencies in Dundee from 1945 until his death in 1952. He was first elected for the two member constituency of Dundee at the 1945 general election, being elected at the head of the poll. When that seat was abolished for the 1950 election he was elected as the first member for the new seat of Dundee East. In parliament he served as Parliamentary Private Secretary to the President of the Board of Trade, working under Stafford Cripps and Harold Wilson, and then from 1950 to 1951 was an Under-Secretary of State at the Colonial Office.The Glasgow Herald'' described him "as one of the most popular Labour men in the House".

Cook died as a result of a road traffic accident a few minutes before midnight on 31 May 1952. He was driving on the Arbroath to Dundee road when the car he was driving left the road and collided with a tree and went over a low wall in to a field resulting in his instant death due to crush injuries to his chest. The owner of the car, a local businessman named John Ross, was also in the vehicle and was taken to Dundee Royal Infirmary to be treated for arm injuries. Cook's wife had died the previous December and he was survived by a son and a daughter.

References

External links 
 

1908 births
1952 deaths
Electrical Trades Union (United Kingdom)-sponsored MPs
Scottish Labour MPs
Members of the Parliament of the United Kingdom for Dundee constituencies
UK MPs 1945–1950
UK MPs 1950–1951
UK MPs 1951–1955
Ministers in the Attlee governments, 1945–1951
Road incident deaths in Scotland